Beninati is an Italian surname. Notable people with the surname include:

Joe Beninati (born 1965), American sports announcer
Joseph Beninati (born 1964), American real estate developer
Manfredi Beninati (born 1970), Italian artist

Italian-language surnames